Greyeagle is an unincorporated community in Mingo County, West Virginia, United States. Their post office no longer exists.

The community took its name from the local Grey Eagle Coal Company.

References 

Unincorporated communities in West Virginia
Unincorporated communities in Mingo County, West Virginia
Coal towns in West Virginia